"Hands to Heaven" is a ballad by English new wave band Breathe, released as their fifth UK single on 20 October 1987 and as the band's second single in the US the following year. The song was written by group members David Glasper and Marcus Lillington. The B-side features an instrumental track "Life and Times".

"Hands to Heaven" was Breathe's breakthrough hit internationally. The single peaked at  4 on the UK Singles Chart in August 1988. That same month in the United States, it logged two weeks at No. 2 on the Billboard Hot 100. The song also reached No. 2 on the Billboard Adult Contemporary chart. "Hands to Heaven" also became a top-10 hit in Canada, Ireland, New Zealand, and Norway.

Music video
The music video, directed by Eamon McCabe, features the group in a surreal dream sequence, with the lead singer falling asleep in a black London taxicab and waking at the end, being driven away by the driver.

Track listings
All songs were written by David Glasper and Marcus Lillington and published by Virgin Music, Inc.

UK 7-inch single (SIREN SRN68)
A. "Hands to Heaven" – 4:18
B. "Life and Times" – 4:46
A special limited edition of the 7-inch single which included photos, lyrics and Fan Club address was released in the UK (SRNL 68).

US 7-inch single and cassette single (A&M AM-2991/TS-2991)
A. "Hands to Heaven" – 4:17
B. "Life and Times" – 4:44

UK 12-inch single (SIREN SRNT68)
A1. "Hands to Heaven" (extended Heaven) – 6:23
B1. "Hands to Heaven" (radio mix) – 4:18
B2. "Life and Times" – 4:46
A special limited edition of the 12-inch single featured a poster sleeve.

UK CD single (SIREN SRCD 68)1
 "Hands to Heaven" – 4:18
 "All That Jazz" (12-inch version) – 6:15
 "Stay" (7-inch version) – 3:50
 "Life and Times" – 4:44

Personnel
Band
 David Glasper – vocals
 Marcus Lillington – guitars, keyboards
 Ian "Spike" Spice – drums
 Mike Delahunty – bass

Guest musician
 Paul "Shilts" Weimar – saxophone

Production
 Arranged by Breathe
 Engineer: John Madden ("Hands to Heaven", "Stay")
 Mixing: John Madden ("Life and Times"), Chris Porter ("All That Jazz")
 Remixing: Chris Porter ("Hands to Heaven")

Charts

Weekly charts

Year-end charts

Cover versions
 Filipino pop singer Christian Bautista covered the song for his self-titled debut album Christian Bautista in 2004 and later the single released on 5 April 2005.

In popular culture
The song was used for the Michael and Julia characters on the American soap opera Santa Barbara.

References

External links
 Single release info at discogs.com
 Official music video

1987 songs
1987 singles
A&M Records singles
Breathe (British band) songs
Song recordings produced by Bob Sargeant
Pop ballads
1980s ballads